Morgan Knowles (born 5 November 1996) is a professional rugby league footballer who plays as a  or  for St Helens in the Super League. He has played for both Wales & England at international level.

Background
Knowles was born in Barrow-in-Furness, Cumbria, England.

Career
Knowled played in the 2019 Challenge Cup Final defeat by Warrington at Wembley Stadium.
Knowles played in the 2019 Super League Grand Final victory over Salford at Old Trafford.

Knowles played in St Helens 2020 Super League Grand Final victory over Wigan at the Kingston Communications Stadium in Hull.
On 17 July 2021, he played for St. Helens in their 26-12 2021 Challenge Cup Final victory over Castleford.
On 9 October 2021, he played in St. Helens 2021 Super League Grand Final victory over Catalans Dragons.
In the 2022 semi-final, Knowles was sent to the sin bin for a chicken wing tackle during St Helens 19-12 victory over Salford which sent the club into their fourth consecutive grand final.  Knowles was later suspended for two matches.  St Helens appealed the decision which the RFL rejected.  Knowles and St Helens then put in a second appeal which was successful meaning he was free to play in the 2022 Super League Grand Final.
On 24 September 2022, Knowles played for St Helens in their 2022 Super League Grand Final victory over Leeds.
On 18 February 2023, Knowles played in St Helens 13-12 upset victory over Penrith in the 2023 World Club Challenge.

Representative
On 25 June 2021 he made a try scoring début for England in their 24-26 defeat to the Combined Nations All Stars, staged at the Halliwell Jones Stadium, Warrington, as part of England’s 2021 Rugby League World Cup preparation.

References

External links
St Helens profile
SL profile
(archived by web.archive.org) Statistics at rlwc2017.com
Saints Heritage Society profile
England profile

1996 births
Living people
England national rugby league team players
English rugby league players
English people of Welsh descent
Rugby league players from Barrow-in-Furness
Rugby league hookers
St Helens R.F.C. players
Wales national rugby league team players